Aforia indomaris is a species of sea snail, a marine gastropod mollusk in the family Cochlespiridae.

Distribution
This species occurs in the Indian Ocean off the Seychelles.

References

 Sysoev, A.V. & Kantor, Yu.I. (1988) Three new species of deep-sea mollusks of the genus Aforia (Gastropoda, Toxoglossa: Turridae). Apex, 3, 39–46 page(s): 44

External links
 BioLib: Aforia indomaris

indomaris
Gastropods described in 1988